Makinde is a surname. Notable people with the surname include:

Oluwasegun Makinde (born 1991), Nigerian-born Canadian sprinter
Seyi Makinde (born 1967), Nigerian politician, businessman, engineer, and philanthropist

Surnames of Nigerian origin